The  Speaker of the Taraba State House of Assembly is the political head of the Taraba State House of Assembly. Elected by the Members of the Assembly, the speaker's statutory duty is to preside over the sitting and deliberations of the Assembly.

References

State lower houses in Nigeria